White Lightning is a 1953 film directed by Edward Bernds and starring Stanley Clements, Barbara Bestar and Steve Brodie. The film also features a young Lee Van Cleef in an early role.

Plot
The film centers around a professional ice hockey team called the Red Devils who are in the midst of an extended losing streak. The losing streak is due to the team's proprietor Jack Monohan (Steve Brodie) taking bribes from gamblers. The team receives fresh hope in the form of a new player, Mike Connors (Stanley Clements). Mike is an arrogant and self-assured man, who is also Jack's former childhood friend. His talent helps the team regain their formerly winning ways. However, the new star quickly becomes disliked for his egocentric attitude and playing style. Matters worsen when Jack's sister Margaret (Barbara Bestar) becomes attracted in Mike. This romantic interest leads to an out-and-out brawl between the two men. The fight is stopped after a local drifter named Brutus steps in but tragically is stabbed by Mike.  The situation takes a turn for the worse when an angered Mike takes a bribe - to throw the extremely important final game - from a gambler named Rocky Gibraltar (Lyle Talbot). During the game, Mike sees sense with the help of a young, admiring fan named Davey (Duncan Richardson). He helps win the game.

Cast
Stanley Clements as Mike Connors
Barbara Bestar as Margaret Monohan
Steve Brodie as Jack Monohan
Gloria Blondell as Ann Garfield
Paul Bryar as Stew Barton
Lyle Talbot as Rocky Gibraltar
Frank Jenks as Benny Brown
Lee Van Cleef as Brutus Allen
Myron Healey as Nelson
 Riley Hill as Horwin
Duncan Richardson as Davey
Tom Hanlon as Announcer
John Bleifer as Tailor
Jane Easton as Girl
Jon Andrew as Brutus the handicapped sailor

References

External links

1953 films
American black-and-white films
Films directed by Edward Bernds
Monogram Pictures films
1950s sports films
American ice hockey films
1950s English-language films
1950s American films